Muse is the twelfth studio album by Taiwanese singer Jolin Tsai. It was released on September 14, 2012, by Warner and Mars. Produced by Michael Lin, Peggy Hsu, JJ Lin, and Tanya Chua, it integrated pop music with pop art, with music styles spanning mainstream and indie.

The album was well received by music critics, who commented that it's worthy of repeated listening and has depth. It sold more than 100,000 copies in Taiwan, becoming the year's highest-selling album by a female artist and the year's third highest-selling album overall in the country.

The album earned four Golden Melody Award nominations, it was nominated for Best Mandarin Album, Tsai was nominated for Best Female Mandarin Singer, "The Great Artist" was nominated for Song of the Year, and the music video of "The Great Artist" was nominated for Best Music Video. Eventually, "The Great Artist" won Song of the Year.

Background and development 
On August 13, 2010, Tsai released her eleventh studio album, Myself. It sold more than 65,000 copies in Taiwan, and it became the year's highest-selling album by a female artist and the year's fourth highest-selling album overall in the country. On December 24, 2012, Tsai embarked on her third concert tour Myself World Tour.

On February 22, 2012, Warner Music Greater China's president Sam Chen revealed that Tsai's new album would be released in the  summer of the year and was in the stage of collecting songs. On June 12, 2012, Tsai revealed that the album would be released in August 2012, and she would pick ten out of fifteen recorded songs to include on the album. Tsai's manager Tom Wang said: "She is very careful about the album and spends the most time recording it. Some of the songs were recorded again and again. She also put a lot of her own ideas on music, music video, and artwork." On July 10, 2012, Tsai revealed that the album would be released around her birthday on September 15, 2012. On July 23, 2012, Tsai revealed that she had finished recording the album.

Writing and production 

"The Great Artist" describes a love player from a female perspective, and it encourages women to hold on to brave attitude and believe they will eventually meet true love. It is different from Tsai's previous dance songs with multiple emotional transitions and more difficult scales in the rap part. Tsai said: "The song is special, besides its heavy beat, it merged the genre of electronic music, the melody is something I've never tried to interpret before, and it encompasses my own attitude, since the lyrics by Matthew Yen is incisive, girls should have their own ideas, so when I record this song, I put myself into the personality of becoming a strong woman." "Wandering Poet" depicts the joy and sorrow of an egocentric romantic poet from the opposite angle. Songwriter Peggy Hsu said: "The music arrangement seems to be telling a story. It is a little classical, but it is a little complicated with pitch shifts and changes of speed and rhythm. However, Tsai's singing style and tone made the song imply a poet's loneliness that can be understood by most people."

"Dr. Jolin" was inspired by the 2012 phenomenon, and it encourages people to look at the real world with their true selves and humor. "Mosaic" depicts a woman who lost herself in love to appeal to a man's vision. The upbeat rhythm of "Spying on You Behind the Fence" well complements its playful lyrics, it uses "fence" to metaphor the distance of love, and it depicts people who in a love relationship often doubt their own happiness because of their pessimistic personality. "Fantasy" was inspired by the emotional life of gay community, and Tsai said: "I Hope it dedicates true love to everyone, because in the world of love, everyone is equal."

Songwriter Tanya Chua talked about "I": "When I met with Tsai, she said she wanted to sing a song exclusively for herself. Although it is ballad but it is not a love song, it is about facing herself without spotlight and applause completely. I was touched by her willingness to share her vulnerability, so I asked Xiao Han to write the lyrics for her, I hope through 'I' we can walk into Tsai's inner world, and feel we are all the same." "Beast" was Tsai's first songwriting work following "Metronome" from her 2007 album Agent J, and Tsai said: "There are some happy or sad things going on around me, such as love stories and funny things, so they are always sources of inspiration." "Friday the 13th" was inspired by the jokes among party friends, and it encourages single people to have fun on Valentine's Day. Tsai said "Color Photos" reminded her of photos that fans collected for her, and she added: "Everyone's every photo is full of kinds of feelings, even if photos have begun to yellowed or faded, but memory is still as beautiful as color of the past." In "Someone", Tsai expressed her appreciation for Tizzy Bac's live performing style, and she hoped to explore more of her vocal potential with the song.

Title and artwork 

In ancient Greek religion and mythology, Muses are nine inspirational goddesses of literature, science, and arts. In current English usage, "muse" can refer to a person who inspires an artist, musician, or writer. Tsai described: "The meaning behind 'Muse' is inspiration. For me, art is not only profound and difficult for people to understand, but it is actually something you live around. Maybe some people use paintings to convey what they feel, so I'm singing and performing, so I want to bring art to my performance."

On July 23, 2012, Tsai released a series of promotional photos for the album, and they were photographed by Guillaume Millet and features Tsai wearing costume designed by Chen Shao-yen. Chen Shao-yen said: "[The costumes were] inspired by French show girls of the 1930s, at that moment divas often performed in a neutral yet sexy outfits, exuding a charming glamour, much like Tsai herself and this album." With a total of NT$8 million budget, this series of promotional photos were photographed in Paris, France. The second series of promotional photos were photographed at Musée des Arts Forains in Paris, France, and they features Tsai wearing costumes designed again by Chen Shao-yen. Chen Shao-yen said: "After listened to her 'The Great Artist', her graceful dance moves emerged in my mind, but the lyrics used the great artist to describe love player, I think this song encourages girls to have both sexy and brave attitude to deal with love, so I had an inspiration to design the outfit that hugged her curves cleverly."

The promotional photos photographed in France were included on the pre-order version "Muse of Dream", and the cover art and artwork of another pre-order version "Muse of Love" features Tsai wearing outfits designed by Tomas Chan. The cover art of the single "The Great Artist" features Tsai wearing silver headdress of Miao people in Yunnan, China, and the collector said the headdress was acquired by his ancestor when he traveled to China in the 18th or 19th century. The cover art and artwork of the album's standard edition were photographed by Tong Meng, and the album's package was designed by Aaron Nieh. The cover art and artwork of the album's deluxe edition were photographed by Liang Su, and the package was designed again by Aaron Nieh.

Release and promotion 
On August 22, 2012, Warner announced the album was available for pre-order since today and would be released on September 14, 2012, and they announced that the album has two pre-order versions—"Muse of Dream" and "Muse of Love". On September 13, 2012, Tsai held a press conference for the album release at Central Academy of Fine Arts in Beijing, China. On September 26, 2012, Tsai held a press conference in Taipei, Taiwan and announced that it topped the weekly album sales charts of Chia Chia, Eslite, Five Music, G-Music, Kuang Nan, and Pok'elai in its first week of release.

On October 6, 2012, Tsai held the Muse Concert in Tainan, Taiwan. On October 26, 2012, Tsai released the special limited edition of the album, and it additionally includes five music videos and 11 live tracks from her Muse Concert. In 2012, the album reached number two, number two, and number eight on the yearly album sales charts of Five Music, G-Music, and Pok'elai, respectively. As of the end of 2012, the album had sold more than 95,000 copies in Taiwan, and it became the year's highest-selling album by a female artist and the year's third highest-selling album overall in the country. In 2013, the album reached number eight on the yearly album sales chart of G-Music.

Live performances 
On September 30, 2012, Tsai performed "The Great Artist" at the 2012 CCTV Mid-Autumn Festival Gala. On October 13, 2012, Tsai recorded the Chinese television show Happy Camp and performed "The Great Artist" and "Mosaic"; The show was broadcast on November 3, 2012. On November 5, 2012, Tsai recorded the Chinese television show Your Face Sounds Familiar and performed "Fantasy" and "Dr. Jolin"; The show was broadcast on November 18, 2012. On December 31, 2012, Tsai performed "Beast" and "The Great Artist" at the Hunan TV 2013 New Year's Eve Concert. On January 19, 2013, Tsai attended the 8th KKBox Music Awards and performed "The Great Artist", "Fantasy", and "Dr. Jolin".

On January 30, 2012, Tsai performed "The Great Artist", "Beast", "Fantasy", and "Dr. Jolin" at the Taiwan Music Night in Paris, France. On April 18, 2012, Tsai attended the 17th China Music Awards in Macau, China and performed "The Great Artist" and "Dr. Jolin". On May 17, 2012, Tsai performed "The Great Artist" and "Dr. Jolin" at the 3rd Global Chinese Golden Chart North America Concert in Vancouver, Canada. On June 2, 2013, Tsai attended the 2012 Hito Music Awards and performed "The Great Artist" and "Dr. Jolin". On June 6, 2013, Tsai attended the 24th Golden Melody Awards and performed "The Great Artist". Since then, Tsai has attended a series of events and performed songs from the album.

Singles 

On August 15, 2012, Tsai released the single, "The Great Artist", and its music video was released on August 22, 2012. The music video was directed by Muh Chen, and it was set in a "futuristic salon", Muh Chen said: "In the 17th and 18th centuries, salon was the social occasion and cultural center where French bourgeoisie and aristocrats talked about literature and art. The hosts of salon were all women aristocrats with intelligence, grace, and knowledge. The feminism background coincided with the lyrics of 'The Great Artist'." With a total of NT $8 million budget, the music video took 38 hours in both Kaohsiung and Taipei to film, and five costumes in the music video were designed by three designers. On August 23, 2012, Tsai held a promotional event for the music video at Taipei Circle in Taipei, Taiwan. The music video reached number nine on the Taiwan's YouTube yearly most-watched videos chart of 2012. It also made Tsai become the first female artist to receive full score on YinYueTai. On January 2, 2013, "The Great Artist", "Wandering Poet", and "Dr. Jolin" reached number two, number 10, and number 24 on the 2012 Hit FM Top 100 Singles of the Year chart, respectively.

Music videos 

On September 11, 2012, Tsai released the music video of "Wandering Poet", which was directed by JP Huang features Taiwanese actress Ariel Lin and actor Austin Lin. The music video depicts the actress falling in love with an eccentric romantic poet, and the actress found what she had was actually a duplicated love. Tsai said: "In preparing to record the song, I also thought of the leading actress in Black Swan (2010), maybe every girl has two sides when dealing with love, the one is external, and the other is internal, many girls are not good at expressing their joy and sorrow, they hide all the feelings, the singer me is like the 'Black Swan', and the actress Ariel Lin is like the 'White Swan'."

On September 24, 2012, Tsai released the music video of "Dr. Jolin", which was directed by Marlboro Lai. In the music video, Tsai played a doctor in the "future world", and there would be an interchange of gender attribute between men and women; It revealed Tsai's support for the gender equality. On October 3, 2012, Tsai released the music video of "Mosaic", which was directed by Chen Hung-i. It made full use of black and white colors in order to highlight the vibe of the ballad. On October 15, 2012, Tsai released the music video of "Spying on You Behind the Fence", which was directed by Jude Chen. It opens with a black cat, which is a metaphor for women's caution in love. The color tone and scene are full of European style, and the shooting angle shows the actual sense of spying.

On October 25, 2012, Tsai released the music video of "Fantasy", and it was directed by Bill Chia. It was set in the "Garden of Eden" and filmed at the Future Pavilion of Taipei Expo Park in Taipei, Taiwan. It depicts people of different races, colors, and genders are all worthy of love. Tsai said: "In fact, there are many such love happened in our life now, no matter male or female, there are such lovers around me. I think love is equal, the music video brought the story of "Garden of Eden" to the present, which is in line with the lyrics of 'Fantasy'." On December 10, 2012, Tsai released the music video of "I", and it was directed by Fu Tien-yu. It set the scene for Tsai to look back at her pure self without makeup after removed her complicated makeup on the stage. On February 22, 2013, Tsai released the music videos of "Color Photos" and "Friday the 13th", which were directed by Jade Chen, and the former features Taiwanese actor Johnny Yang and actress Phoebe Lin. On March 13, 2013, Tsai released the music video of "Beast" directed by Bill Chia, and it depicts the struggle between the consciousness and unconsciousness.

Critical reception 

The album received generally positive reviews upon release. PlayMusic's critic Hui Lan gave the album 4 out of 5 stars, she added: "The music arrangement and mixing effect of the album's dance songs are particularly excellent, the singer has a sweet, clear, and powerful voice, which shows the singing ability that a diva-level singer should definitely have. If ballads can test a singer's singing skills, singing dance songs is also an advantage." Freshmusic gave the album 7.5 out of 10 stars, and it commented that the album "has gradually revealed a different from the past which was too gaudy, and it marked the beginning of her new phase." 

Tencent Entertainment gave the album 7 out of 10 stars, reasoning that: "Although Muse is still based on pop, the overall vibe is quite different from that of Tsai's previous albums of recent years." British journalist Michael McCarthy commented: "It's pure pop goodness, bathed in rich kaleidoscopic color, the sort of pop that has the depth to reward repeated listens." Cool-Style's writer Jamie Lee described the album: "In terms of the album's overall production and breakthrough, Muse is definitely one of the best albums of the year."

Accolades 
On September 17, 2012, the nominees for the 2012 MTV Europe Music Awards were announced, and Tsai earned an nomination for Best Asian Act. On January 19, 2013, Tsai won a KKBox Music Award for Top 10 Singers. On April 9, 2013, the album won a Global Chinese Golden Chart Award for Best Album, "The Great Artist" won Top 20 Songs, and Tsai won Best Female Singer. On April 13, 2013, Tsai earned a V Chart Award for Best Female Singer (Hong Kong/Taiwan). On April 19, 2013, Tsai won a China Music Award for Favorite Asia Influential Singer, and the album won Best Album (Hong Kong/Taiwan). On April 26, 2013, Tsai won a Music Radio China Top Chart Award for Favorite Female Singer (Hong Kong/Taiwan), and "The Great Artist" won Top Songs (Hong Kong/Taiwan). On May 10, 2013, Tsai won a Global Chinese Music Award for Top 5 Favorite Female Singers, and "The Great Artist" won Top 20 Songs.

On May 22, 2013, the nominees for the 24th Golden Melody Awards were announced, Tsai was nominated for Best Mandarin Female Singer, the album was nominated for Best Mandarin Album, "The Great Artist" was nominated for Song of the Year, and the music video of "The Great Artist" was nominated for Best Music Video. On June 2, 2013, Tsai received three Hito Music Awards for Best Female Singer, Global Media Recommend Artist, and Global Mandarin Outstanding Artist, and "The Great Artist" won Top 10 Songs. On July 6, 2013, "The Great Artist" won a Golden Melody Award for Song of the Year. On November 22, 2013, Tsai won a Singapore Hit Award for Favorite Female Singer, and "Mosaic" won Top 10 Songs.

Track listing

Release history

References

External links 
 
 

2012 albums
Jolin Tsai albums
Warner Music Taiwan albums